"Send Them Off!" is a song by English indie pop band Bastille. It was released on 31 August 2016 as the second single from their second studio album, Wild World (2016). The song was written by Dan Smith, who handled the production along with Mark Crew. The song is featured in soundtrack of the EA Sports video game FIFA 17, and was brought back for FIFA 23, as part of the game’s Ultimate FIFA Soundtrack (a compilation of 40 songs from past FIFA games).

Critical reception
Rhian Daily of NME praised the song's hip-hop influences, as well as the lyrics (including the quotations of William Shakespeare). Jordan Osbourne of Vendor Culture gave the song a similar review, rating it a "7.5/10", and praising both the production and the influence of Othello and The Exorcist.

Music video
A music video for the song was unveiled the same day it was released as a single. The music video features a young man traveling through a long hallway, a church ruin, a horsedrawn carriage driven by an hooded figure and ending up in a chapel while getting chased by a horned figure.

Personnel
Dan Smith – lead vocals, keyboards, programming
Kyle Simmons – keyboards
Will Farquarson – bass, acoustic guitar, electric guitar

Charts

Certifications

References

2016 singles
2016 songs
Bastille (band) songs
Virgin Records singles
Songs written by Dan Smith (singer)
British rock songs
Works based on Othello
Music based on works by William Shakespeare